Aidar Bekzhanov (born  in Oral) is a Kazakh short track speed skater.

Bekzhanov competed at the 2010 Winter Olympics for Kazakhstan. In the 500 metres, he was disqualified in his first round heat, failing to advance. In the 1000 metres, he placed 4th in his opening heat, again failing to advance. His best overall finish was in the 1000, where he placed 28th.

As of 2013, Bekzhanov's best performance at the World Championships came in 2010, when he placed 17th in the 1500 metres.

As of 2013, Bekzhanov has not finished on the podium on the ISU Short Track Speed Skating World Cup. His top World Cup ranking is 20th, in the 500 metres in 2013–14.

References

External links
 

1993 births
Living people
Kazakhstani male short track speed skaters
Olympic short track speed skaters of Kazakhstan
Short track speed skaters at the 2010 Winter Olympics
Short track speed skaters at the 2014 Winter Olympics
Asian Games medalists in short track speed skating
Asian Games bronze medalists for Kazakhstan
Short track speed skaters at the 2011 Asian Winter Games
Medalists at the 2011 Asian Winter Games
Universiade medalists in short track speed skating
People from Oral, Kazakhstan
Universiade bronze medalists for Kazakhstan
Competitors at the 2017 Winter Universiade
21st-century Kazakhstani people